A Lazy Afternoon is a studio album by American hard bop tenor saxophonist Harold Land. The album was recorded in Hollywood and released in 1995 via Postcards Records label.

Reception
Scott Yanow of Allmusic wrote "Harold Land, a long underrated tenor giant based in Los Angeles, is quite melodic yet subtly explorative on his surprising disc. Backed by a string orchestra arranged and conducted by Ray Ellis and a rhythm section led by pianist Bill Henderson, Land explores dozen standards that are highlighted by "Nature Boy," "Invitation" and "You've Changed." He treats the melodies with respect and taste yet is not shy to stretch the music when called for. Harold Land plays beautifully throughout this memorable release."

Jim Macnie of Billboard Magazine noted "Harold Land glides through Ray Ellis' orchestral charts, rhapsodizing forlorn and alluding to noirish days gone by. His Lester Young part comes to the fore here."

Willard Jenkins of JazzTimes stated "Why didn't someone think of this before?... timeless pieces, beautifully rendered... if you are a seeker of beauty, Harold Land has the answer."

Track listing

Personnel
Harold Land – tenor saxophone
Billy Higgins – drums
Bill Henderson – piano
James Leary – bass
Ray Ellis – arranging, conducting

References

Harold Land albums
1995 albums